Russell Kenneth Young (March 19, 1912 – January 19, 1983) was an American football and basketball coach. He served as the head football coach at Nebraska State Teachers College at Wayne—now known as Wayne State College—in 1958 and the University of Wisconsin–Oshkosh in Oshkosh, Wisconsin from 1963 to 1976, compiling a career college football coaching 72–68–2 record of. 
Young was also the head basketball coach at Ripon College in Ripon, Wisconsin from 1956 to 1958 and Wisconsin–Oshkosh from 1962 o 1964, tallying a career college basketball coaching mark of 48–61.

Head coaching record

College football

References

External links
 

1912 births
1983 deaths
Basketball coaches from Wisconsin
Ripon Red Hawks football coaches
Ripon Red Hawks men's basketball coaches
Wayne State Wildcats football coaches
Wisconsin–Oshkosh Titans football coaches
Wisconsin–Oshkosh Titans men's basketball coaches
Wisconsin–Whitewater Warhawks football coaches
High school football coaches in Wisconsin
People from Portage, Wisconsin
Players of American football from Wisconsin